Quiñota District is one of eight districts of the Chumbivilcas Province in Peru.

Geography 
Other mountains are listed below:

Ethnic groups 
The people in the district are mainly indigenous citizens of Quechua descent. Quechua is the language which the majority of the population (95.31%) learnt to speak in childhood, 4.29% of the residents started speaking using the Spanish language (2007 Peru Census).

See also 
 Qañawimayu

References